Dopes to Infinity is the third album by American rock band Monster Magnet. It was released on March 21, 1995.

Overview
The song "Negasonic Teenage Warhead" became the band's first hit single, after having appeared the previous year in different form in the American movie S.F.W.. Other tracks, such as the title track and "Dead Christmas" however, received little or no airplay, resulting in sales of the album being only slightly better than their previous album, Superjudge. The album did reach #51 on the UK Charts and #30 in the German Charts.

A music video was made for the song "Negasonic Teenage Warhead," directed by Gore Verbinski.

In 2011, Monster Magnet revisited the album when they embarked on "Dopes To Infinity 2011: The European Tour", performing the album live in its entirety at several European locations.

Reception

In 2005, Dopes to Infinity was ranked number 406 in Rock Hard magazine's book of The 500 Greatest Rock & Metal Albums of All Time.

Track listing

Australian Tour edition bonus disc

Vinyl double-LP

Personnel
Dave Wyndorf - vocals, bass, guitar, percussion, theremin, organ, bells, mellotron, producer
Ed Mundell - bass, guitar, background vocals
Joe Calandra - guitar, bass, background vocals
Jon Kleiman - percussion, drums, bass, background vocals

Chart positions

Weekly charts

Singles

Miscellanea

 Track 5 was inspired by the character Ego the Living Planet from the Marvel Comics universe.
 During the early days of MTV2 (1998), in between music videos, a conversation in the woods of two stoner types was shown whereby one of the two mentions that Dopes to Infinity was one of the best albums of all time.
 A shorter version of the track "Look to Your Orb for the Warning" was featured on The Matrix soundtrack.
 The main guitar riff to the song Dopes To Infinity was lifted from the 1971 song "Woman Tamer" by the proto-heavy metal band Sir Lord Baltimore

References

Monster Magnet albums
1995 albums
A&M Records albums
Albums recorded at Electric Lady Studios